Mount Saskatchewan can refer to two mountains in Canada: